is a Japanese video game developer, best known for their Ys, The Legend of Heroes, and Trails series. The company was founded in March 1981, making them one of the oldest active video game companies. They are credited with pioneering the action role-playing and Japanese role-playing game genres, as well as popularizing the use of personal computers in Japan.

History

Nihon Falcom was founded by Masayuki Kato in 1981. They are credited with laying the foundations for the action role-playing and Japanese role-playing game genres. The name Falcom came from the Millennium Falcon and the final "n" was changed to an "m" to fit naming trends of that time. The word Nihon, taken after one of the native names of Japan, was added to make it sound more complete.

Falcom's first role-playing game (RPG) was Panorama Toh, released for the PC-8801 in 1983 and created by Yoshio Kiya, who would go on to create the Dragon Slayer and Brandish franchises. While its RPG elements were limited, lacking traditional statistical or leveling systems, the game featured real-time combat with a gun, bringing it close to the action RPG formula that Falcom would later be known for. Set on a desert island, the game's overworld is presented as a hex grid and featured a day-night cycle. There were also indigenous non-player characters (NPCs) who the player could choose to attack, have a conversation with, or give money for items, though NPCs could choose to run away with the money. In order to survive on the island, the player needs to find and consume rations, as every normal action consumes hit points. The island also has traps, which require calling for help and waiting for NPCs to help. The player could also be bit by snakes that poison and paralyze the player, requiring medicine to heal or calling for help from NPCs.

Falcom eventually went on to create their flagship franchises, including the Dragon Slayer, The Legend of Heroes and Ys series. The original Dragon Slayer was responsible for setting the template for the action role-playing genre. Dragon Slayer II: Xanadu (1985) had more than 400,000 copies sold, making it the best-selling PC game up until that time.

While most of Falcom's games have been ported to various video game consoles of all generations, they have only developed a few non-PC video games themselves. The company's decision to develop mainly for PCs rather than consoles set them apart from their main rivals, Enix and Square, but limited the company's popularity in the Western world, thus limiting their growth potential in the 1990s. By the early 2010s, the Ys series was second only to the Final Fantasy series as the largest Japanese role-playing game franchise in terms of the overall number of game releases.

Falcom was also a pioneer in video game music, with their early soundtracks mostly composed by chiptune musicians Yuzo Koshiro and Mieko Ishikawa. They were one of the first game companies to have their own named sound team dedicated to writing scores for their games, known as the Falcom Sound Team jdk.

References

External links 
  

Video game companies established in 1981
Video game companies of Japan
Video game development companies
Companies listed on the Tokyo Stock Exchange
Software companies based in Tokyo
Amusement companies of Japan
Japanese companies established in 1981